Sven Ranck (1616–1684) was a Swedish statesman. Between 1678 and 1684, he served as the Governor of Halland County. He was the owner from 1674 to 1731 of the Marieberg residence in Bohuslän.

External links 
 http://www.marberger.se/marieberg/marieberg.pdf 

Governors of Halland County
Swedish nobility
1616 births
1684 deaths
17th-century Swedish politicians